Pap Jonga (born 1 July 1997) is a Gambian swimmer. The first Olympic swimmer to compete for the Gambia, Jonga competed in the men's 50 metre freestyle event at the 2016 Summer Olympics, where he ranked 79th with a time of 27.48 seconds. He did not advance to the semifinals.

References

1997 births
Living people
Gambian male freestyle swimmers
Olympic swimmers of the Gambia
Swimmers at the 2016 Summer Olympics
Place of birth missing (living people)